Serkis is an alternative name for Segius, Sarkis and Sargis

Serkis may refer to:
Aïbeg and Serkis, also Aibeg and Sergis or Aïbäg and Särgis, two ambassadors sent by the Mongol ruler Baichu to Pope Innocent IV in 1247–1248
Andy Serkis (born 1964), British film actor, director and author
Serkis Diranian (1854-1918), Armenian orientalist painter